Funkstreife Isar 12 is a German television series about a Munich police patrol unit.

The main characters are police sergeant (Polizeimeister) Alois Huber, portrayed by Karl Tischlinger, and his partner, Polizeihauptwachtmeister Herbert Dambrowski, portrayed by Wilmut Borell. They drove a BMW 501 police patrol car with callsign Isar-12.

See also
List of German television series

External links
 

German crime television series
1960s German police procedural television series
1961 German television series debuts
1963 German television series endings
Television shows set in Munich
German-language television shows
Das Erste original programming